Elizabeth Walcott-Hackshaw (born 1964) is a Trinidadian writer and academic, who is Professor of French Literature and Creative Writing at the University of the West Indies. Her writing encompasses both scholarly and creative work, and she has also co-edited several books. Walcott-Hackshaw is the daughter of Nobel Prize laureate Derek Walcott.

Biography
Born in Trinidad in 1964, Walcott-Hackshaw studied in the United States, returning to Trinidad in 1992. She has co-edited several books and has written scholarly essays and articles particularly on Francophone Caribbean literature. Her first collection of short stories, Four Taxis Facing North, was published in 2007, later being translated into Italian. Her first novel, Mrs. B, was published in 2014, when it was shortlisted for the “Best Book Fiction” in the Guyana Prize for Literature. She has published book reviews and creative writing in such journals as The Caribbean Review of Books and Small Axe, and her short stories have been widely translated as well as anthologized, including in Trinidad Noir: The Classics, edited by Earl Lovelace and Robert Antoni (2017), and New Daughters of Africa, edited by Margaret Busby (2019).

Selected publications

Fiction
 Four Taxis Facing North (short stories), Peepal Tree Press, 2007.
 Mrs. B (novel), Peepal Tree Press, 2014.
 Stick No Bills (short stories), Peepal Tree Press, 2020.

As editor
 (With Martin Munro) Reinterpreting the Haitian Revolution and Its Cultural Aftershocks, University of the West Indies Press, 2006.
 (With Martin Munro) Echoes of the Haitian Revolution 1804–2004, University of the West Indies Press, 2009.
 (With Nicole Roberts) Border Crossings: A Trilingual Anthology of Caribbean Women Writers, University of the West Indies Press, 2012.
 (With Barbara Lalla, Nicole Roberts and Valerie Youssef) Methods in Caribbean Research: Literature, Discourse, Culture, University of the West Indies Press, 2013.

References

External links
 "Elizabeth Walcott-Hackshaw reading", 7 July 2007.
 "Under the Surface", Writing a New Caribbean, BBC Radio 4, 20 February 2017.

Living people
1964 births
Trinidad and Tobago women writers
21st-century women writers
21st-century short story writers
Trinidad and Tobago novelists
University of the West Indies academics
Trinidad and Tobago academics
Trinidad and Tobago women novelists
Women short story writers